The De La Warr Pavilion is a grade I listed building, located on the seafront at Bexhill on Sea, East Sussex, on the south coast of England.

The Modernist and International Style building was designed by the architects Erich Mendelsohn and Serge Chermayeff and constructed in 1935. Although sometimes claimed to be the first major Modernist public building in Britain, it was preceded by some months by the Dutch-influenced Hornsey Town Hall.

In 2005, after an extensive restoration, the De La Warr Pavilion reopened as a contemporary arts centre, encompassing one of the largest galleries on the south coast of England.

On 18 February 2022, the bandstand, added early in the 21st century, was destroyed by strong winds from Storm Eunice.

History
The new seafront building was the result of an architectural competition initiated by Herbrand Sackville, 9th Earl De La Warr, after whom the building was named.

The 9th Earl, a committed socialist and Mayor of Bexhill, persuaded Bexhill council to develop the site as a public building. The competition was announced in the Architects' Journal in February 1934, with a programme that specified an entertainment hall to seat at least 1500 people; a 200-seat restaurant; a reading room; and a lounge. Initially, the budget for the project was limited to £50,000, although this was later raised to £80,000. Run by the Royal Institute of British Architects, this competition attracted over 230 entrants, many of them practising in the Modernist style.

The architects selected for the project, Erich Mendelsohn and Serge Chermayeff, were leading figures in the Modern Movement. The aesthetics employed in the International Style proved especially suited to the building, tending towards streamlined, industrially-influenced designs, often with expansive metal-framed windows, and eschewing traditional brick and stonework in favour of concrete and steel construction. Amongst the building's most innovative features was its use of a welded steel frame construction, pioneered by structural engineer Felix Samuely. Construction of the De La Warr Pavilion began in January 1935. The building was opened on 12 December of the same year by the Duke and Duchess of York (later King George VI and Queen Elizabeth).

During World War II, the De La Warr Pavilion was used by the military. Bexhill and Sussex in general were vulnerable if the Germans decided to mount an invasion (Operation Sea Lion). Amongst those who served at the Pavilion during the War was Spike Milligan, later a noted comedian. The building suffered minor damage to its foundations when the Metropole hotel adjacent to the building's western side was destroyed by German bombers.

After the War, management of the Pavilion was taken over by Bexhill Corporation (which later became Rother District Council). In the 1970s and 1980s, changes were made to the building, many of which were inconsistent with its original design and aesthetic. Lack of funds also resulted in an ongoing degradation of the building’s fabric. It was used as a venue for indoor car boot sales and the exterior lost its original signage.

In 1986, the De La Warr Pavilion was granted a Grade I listed Building status, essentially protecting the building from further inappropriate alteration. 1989 saw the formation of the Pavilion Trust, a group dedicated to protecting and restoring the building. Playwright David Hare notioned that the site be used as an art gallery as opposed to an expected privatised redevelopment. In 2002, after a long application process the De La Warr Pavilion was granted £6 Million by the Heritage Lottery Fund & the Arts Council of England, to restore the building and turn it into a contemporary arts centre. Work began in 2004 on the De La Warr Pavilion’s regeneration and a transfer of the buildings ownership from Rother District Council to the De La Warr Pavilion Charitable Trust. On 15 October 2005, after an 18-month long extensive programme of restoration, the De La Warr Pavilion officially reopened as a contemporary arts centre, encompassing one of the largest galleries on the south coast of England.

A small collection of archival materials related to the De La Warr Pavilion is collected in the Serge Chermayeff Papers held by the Avery Architectural and Fine Arts Library at Columbia University in New York City.

Quotes

Directors

For Rother District Council
(date needed)–1999: Caroline Collier
1999–2011: Alan Haydon

De La Warr Pavilion Charitable Trust
2003–2011:  Alan Haydon
2011–present:  Stewart Drew

Honorary patrons

President: Camilla, Duchess of Cornwall
Earl and Countess De La Warr
Eddie Izzard
Jill Theis
Richard Sykes
Antony Gormley
Ivan Chermayeff

See also
 Saltdean Lido
 Embassy Court

References

External links

Buildings and structures completed in 1935
Art Deco architecture in England
Arts centres in England
Art museums and galleries in East Sussex
Contemporary art galleries in England
Erich Mendelsohn buildings
Grade I listed buildings in East Sussex
Modernist architecture in England
Museums in East Sussex
Streamline Moderne architecture in the United Kingdom
Bexhill-on-Sea